P. Levine may refer to:

Paul Levine
Peter G. Levine
Philip Levine (disambiguation)